Cristiano Sebastião de Lima Júnior (5 June 1979 – 5 December 2004) was a Brazilian footballer who played as a forward for Dempo, before an on-field collision in the Federation Cup finals, with the goalkeeper of his opposing team led to his death.

Career
Júnior, who was the highest-paid footballer in India, signed up for Dempo in September 2004. He had only recently moved to Dempo on a transfer from Kolkata's East Bengal where he had formed an elite strike partnership with India's ace footballer Baichung Bhutia in helping his team win the league title in the 2003-2004 season and reach the knock-out stages of the 2004 AFC Cup.

Death
Júnior collided with Mohun Bagan goalkeeper Subrata Pal, in the 78th minute of the Federation Cup finals. While scoring his second goal after chasing the ball into the box, he collided with the keeper, staggered away and then collapsed.  Attempts to revive him were unsuccessful. The game continued after Junior was taken off the field. He was dead on arrival at Hosmat Hospital, hospital officials said that no doctors were requested to be at the ground during the Federation Cup match, "At no time, was the hospital requested to provide doctors, and no agreement or contract for doctors was made." Dempo won the Cup 2-0.
According to the autopsy performed in the Bangalore Hospital (where Junior was moved from the stadium), the footballer died because of a heart stroke. The report also added that Júnior was not injured at the moment of the arrival to the health center.

Dempo announced that they would retire Júnior's #10 shirt. It filed a complaint of criminal negligence against Subrata Pal, Hosmat Hospital, and the Karnataka State Football Association, the local organizers. Pal was suspended for 2 months.

Honours

Individual
2003-04 National Football League (India): Golden Boot (15 goals)

References

External links

1979 births
2004 deaths
Footballers from Rio de Janeiro (city)
Brazilian footballers
Brazilian expatriate footballers
CR Vasco da Gama players
Olaria Atlético Clube players
Criciúma Esporte Clube players
Sampaio Corrêa Futebol Clube players
América Futebol Clube (RN) players
Expatriate footballers in India
Dempo SC players
Sport deaths in India
Association football players who died while playing
East Bengal Club players
Cristiano
Association football forwards